The 74th constitutional amendment act mandated the setting up and devolution of powers to Urban local bodies (ULBs) or city governments as the lowest unit of governance in cities and towns. This landmark initiative of the Government of India in 1993 was built upon the premise that all ‘power’ in a democracy rightfully belongs to ‘the people’. Power was mandated to be given to the people via the local bodies (referred to as municipalities), namely Municipal Corporations, Councils and Nagar Panchayats, which would have representatives that are elected regularly and have a decisive role in planning, provision and delivery of services.

This Act prescribes institutional changes as well, with the setting up of Ward Committees, District Planning Committees and Metropolitan Planning Committees to coordinate planning across jurisdictions, as well as the setting up of State Election Commissions and State Financial Commissions. Effectively, this act gives ULBs a role much larger than just that of service providers that provide water, waste management, electricity, and so on. Came into force on 1June, 1993.

Major provisions 
 Urban local bodies are known as municipal corporation, municipal council and nagar panchayat based on population. The nagar panchayat is for traditional areas, the municipal council or municipalities are for smaller urban areas and municipal corporation are for larger urban areas.
 It is constituted for a time period of 5 years.
 1/3 reservation for women 
 These bodies have been given the power to legislate and implement scheme for economic development and social justice.
 The legislature of a state can assign specific taxes, duties, tolls, etc. for the functioning of urban local bodies.

References 

74